Yahya Rahmat-Samii (born August 20, 1948) is the Northrop Grumman Chair Professor in Electromagnetics at the Electrical Engineering Department at the University of California, Los Angeles, where he teaches and conducts research on microwave transmission and radio antennas. Professor Rahmat-Samii received his Bachelor of Science degree in Electrical Engineering in 1970 from the University of Tehran, Iran, and the Master of Science in 1972 and the Doctor of Philosophy degrees in Electrical Engineering in 1975 from the University of Illinois at Urbana-Champaign. Before joining UCLA in 1989, he was a Senior Research Scientist at the NASA Jet Propulsion Laboratory.

He has made innovations in satellite communications antennas, personal communication antennas, wearable and implanted antennas for communications and biotelemetry, and antennas for remote sensing and radio astronomy applications. He is the Director of the UCLA Antenna Research, Analysis and Measurement Laboratory.

Awards and honors
IEEE Electromagnetics Award (2011)
Member of the National Academy of Engineering (2008)
Chen-To Tai Distinguished Educator Award of the IEEE Antennas & Propagation Society (2007)
International Union of Radio Science Booker Gold Medal (2005)
Foreign Member of The Royal Academies for Science and the Arts of Belgium (2001)
Honoris Causa Doctorate, Universidade de Santiago de Compostela, Spain (2001)
IEEE Third Millennium Medal (2000)
Distinguished Alumnus Award, Electrical and Computer Engineering Department, University of Illinois at Urbana-Champaign (1999)

Books
 2008: Electromagnetic Band Gap Structures in Antenna Engineering  .
 2006: (with J. Kim) Implanted Antennas in Medical Wireless Communications, Morgan and Claypool Publishers.
 1999: (with E. Michielssen as editors) Electromagnetic Optimization by Genetic Algorithms, Wiley, NY.
 1995: (with D. Hoppe) Impedance Boundary Conditions in Electromagnetics, Taylor & Francis, Washington, DC.

References

External links 
List of members of the National Academy of Engineering (Electronics)

1948 births
Living people
People from Rasht
UCLA Henry Samueli School of Engineering and Applied Science faculty
American electronics engineers
Members of the United States National Academy of Engineering
Foreign members of the Chinese Academy of Engineering
Iranian emigrants to the United States
Iranian electronics engineers
Microwave engineers